Absalom Greeley (April 18, 1823 – October 28, 1885) was the Member of Provincial Parliament (MPP) for Prince Edward in the 1st Legislative Assembly of Ontario from 1867 to 1870. Greeley ran on the political platform of the Reform movement; however he was thought to be a Yankee Tory; a conservative with American origins in the American Whig Party. He is also supportive of the Family Compact which is not consistent with a Reform platform.

Origins

Absalom Greeley is believed to have emigrated from Maine, U.S.A. with his parents in the early half of the 1800s. His father had been a surveyor there. Although largely self-educated, he is credited with good learning and significant intellect. His place of residence after 1881 is unknown.

Political History
In 1869, he is reported in Toronto newspapers as supporting the extravagant expenses at the Governors residence in an attempt to curry favour with the Family Compact. He is also reported to have tried to sell his party nomination for a county seat as Reeve; an attempt which eventually failed and became public knownledge. Greeley did not run in the 1871 election. In 1881, Greeley was charged with forgery in the town of Picton, Prince Edward County.

Parliamentary Work

As an MPP, he worked on the following Committees:

Standing Committees
 Standing Committee on Printing
 Standing Committee on Standing Orders

Select Committees
 Select Committee to inquire into and report upon the endowment and utility of Upper Canada College and its relationship to the educational system
 Select Committee to enquire into the usefulness and cost of wooden railways as a means of furthering the settlement of the country
 Select Committee to consider Bill 33 Respecting Union Houses and Religious Worship
 Select Committee to consider Bill 14 registration of births and deaths and marriages
 Select Committee appointed to examine in to the working of the common and grammar school system of Ontario
 Select Committee to consider Bill 30, An Act for the Encouragement of Agriculture, Horticulture, Arts and Manufactures
 Select Committee to Revise the Standing Orders of this House Affecting Bills relating to Railways, Canals and Telegraphs
 Special Committee to consider the Municipal and Assessments Act

References

External links

Ontario Liberal Party MPPs
Members of the Legislative Council of the Province of Canada
Forgers
1823 births
1885 deaths